Pseudomeges varioti is a species of beetle in the family Cerambycidae. It was described by Eugène Le Moult in 1946. It is known from Thailand, Laos and Vietnam.

References

Lamiini
Beetles described in 1946